Mexico Elmhurst Philatelic Society International, better known as MEPSI, is an organization devoted to the study of all aspects of the postal history of Mexico since 1952. MEPSI became a non-profit corporation under Illinois statues on February 6, 1957 and is a tax exempt educational organization under Internal Revenue Code  section 501(c)(3).

MEPSI is American Philatelic Society affiliate #43.

MEPSI has the largest following in Mexico and the United States. However, the ca. 650 members are spread over more than 27 countries.

Society services
MEPSI offers the following services to its members:
 Mexicana, an award winning quarterly journal.
 A reference library
 Philatelic expertization
 Publication of literature related to the philately of Mexico.

See also
Postage stamps and postal history of Mexico

External links
 MEPSI's Official web site

Philatelic organizations
Elmhurst, Illinois
Philately of Mexico